The 2020 Thomas Cup group stage was held at the Ceres Arena in Aarhus, Denmark, from 9 to 14 October 2021.

The group stage was the first stage of the 2020 Thomas Cup. The two highest-placing teams in each group advanced to the knockout stage.

Draw
The original draw for the tournament was conducted on 3 August 2020, at 15:00 MST, at BWF Headquarters in Kuala Lumpur. BWF then decided to redraw the tournament after the postponement from 2020 to 2021 this time to be conducted on 18 August 2021, at 15:00 MST also at the BWF headquarters in Kuala Lumpur. The 16 teams were drawn to four groups of four and were allocated to three pots based on the World Team Rankings of 18 February 2021.

Group composition

Group A

Chinese Taipei vs Thailand

Indonesia vs Algeria

Indonesia vs Thailand

Chinese Taipei vs Algeria

Indonesia vs Chinese Taipei

Thailand vs Algeria

Group B

Korea vs Germany

Denmark vs France

Korea vs France

Denmark vs Germany

Denmark vs Korea

Germany vs France

Group C

India vs Netherlands

China vs Tahiti

China vs Netherlands

India vs Tahiti

Netherlands vs Tahiti

China vs India

Group D

Japan vs Canada

Malaysia vs Canada

Japan vs Malaysia

References

Thomas Group stage